The 2022 Snooker Shoot Out (officially the 2022 BetVictor Snooker Shoot Out) was a professional ranking snooker tournament that took place from 20 to 23 January 2022 at the Morningside Arena in Leicester, England. It was the eighth ranking event of the 2021–22 snooker season, played under a variation of the standard rules of snooker. The event was the fourth of eight events sponsored by BetVictor, making up the 2022 European Series.

Ryan Day was the defending champion, having defeated Mark Selby 1–0 (67–24) in the 2021 final, but he was defeated in the first round by Jak Jones.

Hossein Vafaei won the first professional title of his career, beating Mark Williams 1–0 (71–0) in the final.

Tournament format

Prize fund
The total prize fund for the event was £171,000 with the winner receiving £50,000. The breakdown of prize money is shown below:

 Winner: £50,000
 Runner-up: £20,000
 Semi-final: £8,000
 Quarter-final: £4,000
 Last 16: £2,000
 Last 32: £1,000
 Last 64: £500
 Last 128: £250 (Prize money at this stage did not count towards prize money rankings)
 Highest break: £5,000
 Total: £171,000

Tournament draw

Top half

Section 1

Section 2

Section 3

Section 4

Bottom half

Section 5

Section 6

Section 7

Section 8

Finals

Final

Notes

Century breaks 
Total: 2

 123  Hossein Vafaei
 103  Allan Taylor

References

2022
2022 in snooker
2022 in English sport
2022
January 2022 sports events in the United Kingdom
European Series